Wallerfing is a municipality in the district of Deggendorf in Bavaria, Germany.

References

Deggendorf (district)